Metallolophia subradiata is a moth of the family Geometridae first described by William Warren in 1897. It is found on Peninsular Malaysia, Sumatra and Borneo. The habitat consists of lower montane forests and hill dipterocarp forests.

The anterior of the forewing has a pale greenish ground colour, while the rest of the wing is strongly irrorated (sprinkled) with black.

References

Moths described in 1897
Pseudoterpnini